Subir Raha (28 August 1948 – 1 February 2010) a former Director (HR) of Indian Oil Corporation and ex-chairman and MD of Oil and Natural Gas Corporation received global recognition as Energy Executive of the year 2005, from the Petroleum Economist, London, in September 2006.

Early life 
Born on 28 August 1948, Raha graduated in Electronics & Telecommunications Engineering, specializing in Industrial Electronics from Jadavpur University in 1969, with several prizes including the medal for being the Best All-rounder graduate of the university.

Later, he completed his MBA with Distinction at the University of Leeds in 1985, specializing in Strategic Marketing. He was also an alumnus of the Administrative Staff College, Henley (1995).

Career

ONGC
Raha  served as Chairman & Managing Director of Oil and Natural Gas Corporation a Government of India Enterprise, for five years from 25 May 2001.

Oil Coordination Committee
Raha served (1996–98) as deputy  in the Ministry of Petroleum & Natural Gas, Government of India, as the Head of the Oil Coordination Committee (OCC), the nodal agency for planning, monitoring and control of Oil & Gas business under the Administered Pricing regime. On this assignment, he managed, among other things, national logistics, strategic planning, involved in imports/exports, administered pricing and reform strategy. He developed the Petroleum Federation of India (Petrofed), the Chamber of Commerce for Oil and Gas Industry. He is a founding-member of the Petrotech Society, chartered to promote academics in India's Oil & Gas Industry.

IndianOil
Raha served IndianOil from 1970 to 2001. He served as Director (HR) (1998–2001), and concurrently, Director in-charge of Business Development, Information Technology and Corporate Communications of Indian Oil Corporation Ltd (IndianOil). During his years in IndianOil, Mr. Raha handled field and staff assignments in Supply & Distribution, Plant Operations, Engineering, Sales, HR and Marketing. He created several Indian Firsts: networked on-line transaction processing (OLTP) across India (1986–88), real-time automated product terminals (1993–95), and modern Retail Outlets with Convenience Stores & ATM (1995–96). Several of his innovations, especially in Logistics and LPG cooking gas marketing, became Industry standards. As Director (HR), he set up India's first in-house MBA program. He conceptualized and piloted the first global-scale ERP implementation in India.

He created the IndianOil Foundation to protect, preserve and promote the archaeological heritage of India. He set up lubricant blending in Malaysia and retail marketing in Mauritius. He successfully managed privatization of Lubrizol India Ltd. He was Chairman or Director on several JVs including IndianOil Petronas Ltd. From 1999 to 2004, Raha played a key role in Petronet LNG Ltd. (director in 1999-2001 and member of the Promoters’ Committee, 2001 to 2006), a PPP company for initiating LNG business in India.

Death
Raha died in New Delhi on 1 February 2010 of lung cancer. He is survived by his wife and two children, a daughter and a son.

Remembrance 
Annually, UN Global Compact Network India (UN GCNI) organizes the Subir Raha Memorial Lecture.

After his death, Subir Raha Oil Museum was established at the premises of ONGC HQ in Dehradun.

References

1948 births
2010 deaths
Alumni of the University of Leeds
Deaths from lung cancer in India
Jadavpur University alumni
Indian chief executives
Businesspeople from West Bengal
Indian businesspeople in the oil industry
20th-century Indian businesspeople